The Protestant Religion and Presbyterian Church Act 1707 (c 6) is an Act of the pre-Union Parliament of Scotland which was passed to ensure that the status of the Church of Scotland would not be affected by the Union with England. Its long title is "An Act for Securing the Protestant Religion and Presbyterian Church Government".

The Protestant Religion and Presbyterian Church Act 1707 has the constitutional distinction of being named in the Regency Act 1937 as a statute that may not be amended during a regency. The Regency Act 1937 provides that a regent may not assent to a bill to amend the Act of 1707, or any bill affecting the line of succession. When the Regency Bill was debated in the House of Commons, the attorney-general explained, "The safeguarding of this particular Act of the Scottish Parliament was expressly mentioned in the Act of Union, and that is the historic reason why it appears here."

An Act of the Parliament of England, 6 Anne c 8, had made similar provision for the Church of England in 1706 but is not mentioned in the Regency Act.

See also
Succession to the Crown Act 1707

External links
Official text of the Protestant Religion and Presbyterian Church Act 1707 as amended and in force today within the United Kingdom, from the UK Statute Law Database
Official text of the Act 6 Anne c. 8 (1706) as amended and in force today within the United Kingdom, from the UK Statute Law Database

References

1707 in law
1707 in Scotland
Constitutional laws of the United Kingdom
Acts of the Parliament of Scotland
Christianity and law in the 18th century
History of the Church of Scotland
1707 in Christianity

Church of Scotland